Soteska may refer to several places in Slovenia: 

Soteska, Dolenjske Toplice, a settlement in the Municipality of Dolenjske Toplice
Soteska, Kamnik, a settlement in the Municipality of Kamnik
Soteska, Ljubljana, a former village in central Slovenia, now part of the city of Ljubljana
Soteska pri Moravčah, a settlement in the Municipality of Moravče